Anne Wheaton can refer to:
 Anne Wheaton, wife of actor and writer Wil Wheaton 
 Anne Williams Wheaton (1892–1977), American publicist